Alexey Shaydulin or Alexei Shajdulin (b ) is a Bulgarian amateur boxer best known to win a silver medal at the World Championships 2005 and a bronze medal at the European Championships 2006 at featherweight.

Career
At the 2006 European Amateur Boxing Championships in Plovdiv he lost the semifinal to Shahin Imranov. He failed to qualify for the 2004 Summer Olympics by ending up in third place at the 2nd AIBA European 2004 Olympic Qualifying Tournament in Warsaw, Poland.

External links
Euro

Year of birth missing (living people)
Living people
Bulgarian male boxers
AIBA World Boxing Championships medalists
Featherweight boxers